The 1997 Grand Prix de Tennis de Toulouse was a men's tennis tournament played on Indoor Hard in Toulouse, France that was part of the World Series of the 1997 ATP Tour. It was the sixteenth edition of the tournament and was held from 22 September – 28 September.

Seeds
Champion seeds are indicated in bold text while text in italics indicates the round in which those seeds were eliminated.

Draw

Finals

References

Doubles
Grand Prix de Tennis de Toulouse